There are many papal pronouncements against Freemasonry; the most prominent include:

Before Pius IX

.
.
.
.
.
.
.

Pius IX

.
.
.
.
.
.

Leo XIII

.
.
.
.
.

.
.

Notes

References

Catholicism and Freemasonry
Documents of the Catholic Church